George Moresby-White was a British playwright and screenwriter. He is also known as G.H. Moresby-White. One of his plays was the basis for the 1955 comedy film No Smoking.

Selected filmography
 Britannia of Billingsgate (1933)
 Friday the Thirteenth (1933)
 Midnight Menace (1937)
 Take a Chance (1937)
 The Heirloom Mystery (1937)

References

Bibliography
 Halliwell, Leslie. Halliwell's Film Guide. HarperPerennial, 1996.

External links

British writers
British male screenwriters